Křemešník is a mountain in the municipality of Nový Rychnov in the Vysočina Region of the Czech Republic. The mountain lies near the town of Pelhřimov and is part of Bohemian-Moravian Highlands.

History
The mountain was a traditional gathering place for pilgrims. In 1710–1720, a Baroque-style church was built on the top of the mountain (extending an older, Gothic church building from 1555). Stations of the cross has been built as well.

During the 15th century, a silver mine existed there.

Next to the spring with slightly radioactive water lies a small chapel from 1689. According to legend, the spring has miraculous healing abilities. A 52-meter-high steel view-tower called Pípalka was erected here. A small but unfinished romantic-style villa-castelet Větrný zámek from 1930 lies next to the church.

The sculptor Josef Šejnost created a coin museum at the Windmill House in the town in 1939.

Tourism
There is a infrastructure for tourism including a hotel, ski-lift and tourist pathway.

References

External links
Tourist info about Křemešník, photos (cz)
Photos of Křemešník (cz)

Mountains and hills of the Czech Republic
Pelhřimov District